Cântec de leagăn ("cradle song") is a lullaby in Romania which is a free form song performed in personal and unstructured context. There is some debate as to whether or not it may have spawned the doina musical style.

References

Lullabies
Romanian songs
Romanian children's songs
Romanian music
Romanian-language songs